Margaret Arline Judge (February 21, 1912 – February 7, 1974) was an American actress singer who worked mostly in low-budget B movies, but gained some fame for habitually marrying.

Early years
Arline Judge was born in Bridgeport, Connecticut, the daughter of newspaperman John Judge and his wife, Margaret Ormond Judge. She was educated at St. Augustine's in Bridgeport and at New Rochelle College, leaving the latter to seek a career in acting.

Stage
Judge made her theatrical debut in Broadway musicals and revues such as The Second Little Show and Silver Slipper. A part in George White's Scandals provided an opportunity to demonstrate her skills at comedy and dancing.

Film

After meeting director Wesley Ruggles on a train, she got her start in films with his help, then married him. Nicknamed "One-Take Sally," her film career spanned the 1930s and 1940s.

Judge co-starred in When Strangers Meet (1934), among other films.

Television
Judge had a few television appearances, the last one in 1964 as Emmalou Schneider in the Perry Mason episode "The Case of the Nautical Knot".

Personal life
Judge was married seven times and had two sons: Wesley Ruggles Jr. by her first husband, Wesley Ruggles, and Dan Topping Jr. with second husband, Dan Topping, who from 1945 to 1964 was president and part owner of the New York Yankees. She married Ruggles in 1931 and divorced him on April 9, 1937, a few hours before she married Topping, whom she divorced in 1940.

Her other husbands were:
 James Ramage Addams (October 7, 1942 - July 24, 1945)
 Vincent Morgan Ryan (August 3, 1945 - April 23, 1947)
 Henry J. (Bob) Topping (April 29, 1947 - April 23, 1948; brother of second husband Dan Topping)
 George Ross III (January 18, 1949 - August 10, 1950)
 Edward Cooper Heard (April 9, 1955 - November 2, 1960)

Judge was found dead February 7, 1974, in her West Hollywood, California, apartment, age 61. She died of natural causes.  She was interred in Saint Michael's Cemetery in Stratford, Connecticut.

Filmography

Footnotes

External links
 

Arline Judge at Virtual History

1912 births
1974 deaths
20th-century American actresses
American film actresses
American television actresses
Actresses from Bridgeport, Connecticut